Langton Dock was a railway station on the Liverpool Overhead Railway, adjacent to the dock of the same name.

It was opened in May 1896 due to demand from the busy nature of the dock. The station had a hydraulic lift bridge which enabled a section of track to be lifted up to allow large vehicles to pass underneath.

The station closed on 5 March 1906. No evidence of this station remains.

References

Sources

External links
 Langton Dock station on Subterranea Britannica

Disused railway stations in Liverpool
Former Liverpool Overhead Railway stations
Railway stations in Great Britain opened in 1896
Railway stations in Great Britain closed in 1906